Home is an album by bassist Steve Swallow featuring poetry by Robert Creeley recorded in 1979 and released on the ECM label.

Reception
The Allmusic review by Ron Wynn awarded the album 2½ stars calling it an "Interesting concept".

Track listing
All music by Steve Swallow and text by Robert Creeley

 "Some Echoes" - 5:37
 ""She Was Young..." (From "The Finger")" - 3:34 
 ""Nowhere One..."" - 5:01
 "Colors" - 4:23
 "Home" - 3:24
 "In the Fall" - 4:00
 ""You Didn't Think..."" - 2:55
 "Ice Cream" - 4:17
 "Echo" - 5:23
 "Midnight" - 3:42

Personnel
Steve Swallow - electric bass
Sheila Jordan - voice
Steve Kuhn - piano
David Liebman - saxophones
Lyle Mays - synthesizer
Bob Moses - drums

References

ECM Records albums
Steve Swallow albums
Albums produced by Manfred Eicher
1980 albums